The sixth World Series of Poker Europe (WSOPE) took place from September 21, 2012 to October 4, 2012, at Hôtel Majestic Barrière and Le Croisette Casino Barrière in Cannes, France. There were seven bracelet events, culminating in a €10,450 No Limit Hold'em Main Event.

The Main Event was won by Phil Hellmuth, who increased his WSOP-record bracelet total to 13. He also became the first player ever to have won the Main Events of both the World Series of Poker in Las Vegas and the WSOPE; he claimed the Las Vegas Main Event title in 1989.

Event schedule

Main Event

The 2012 World Series of Poker Europe Main Event began on September 29 and finished on October 4. The event drew 420 entrants, generating a prize pool of €4,032,000. The top 48 players made the money, with the winner earning €1,022,376.

Final table

*-Career statistics prior to beginning of 2012 WSOPE Main Event

Final Table results

Notes

World Series of Poker Europe
2012 in poker